Bauyrzhan is a Kazakh given name used in Muslim families. The name has two parts: the first, Bauyr, a traditional Kazakh word meaning brother or relative; the second, jan/jaan, a Persian and Urdu word  meaning soul or dear. 

The name Bauyrjan is sometimes spelled by Russian-speaking peoples in Central Asia as Bauyrzhan, since the closest equivalent of the j sound in Russian is spelled as zh.

Notable people with the given name 
 Bauyrzhan Momyshuly, Kazakh military officer and author
 Bauyrzhan Mukhamedzhanov, Kazakh politician
 Bauyrzhan Islamkhan, Kazakh football player
 Bauyrzhan Turysbek, Kazakh football player
 Bauyrjan Baibek, Kazakh politician
 Bauyrzhan Orazgaliyev, Kazakh wrestler

References

Kazakh masculine given names